Scotland, PA is a 2001 film directed and written by Billy Morrissette. It is a modernized version of William Shakespeare's Macbeth.  The film stars James LeGros, Maura Tierney, and Christopher Walken. Shakespeare's tragedy, originally set in Dunsinane Castle in 11th century Scotland, is reworked into a dark comedy set in 1975, centered on "Duncan's Cafe", a fast-food restaurant in the small town of Scotland, Pennsylvania. The setting of Pennsylvania coincides with two real towns, Scotland, southwest of Harrisburg on the outskirts of Chambersburg, Edinboro, just south of Erie, after Scotland's Edinburgh. The film was shot in Halifax, Nova Scotia.

Plot
In 1975, Duncan's, a fast-food restaurant owned by Norm Duncan in the tiny hamlet of Scotland, Pennsylvania, hosts a variety of workers. Joe “Mac” McBeth is passed over for a promotion to manager by Douglas McKenna, who has been embezzling the restaurant's money. Three stoned hippies, one a fortune teller, inform Mac that they see a bank drive-thru style restaurant in his future as management. Mac and his wife Pat then play informants on McKenna, and Duncan recognizes the value of Mac's efforts on behalf of the restaurant. Duncan shares with the McBeths his plans to turn his failing burger joint into a drive-through, and Mac realizes how profitable the drive-through could be, after which Duncan is hit in the head with a refrigerator door and passes out briefly. Pat then decides to murder Duncan in a staged robbery. Mac and Pat attack Duncan to acquire the combination to the restaurant's safe, and Mac assaults Duncan, but is distracted by a vision of the three hippies, allowing Duncan to fall head first into a deep fryer that splatters and burns Pat's hand. Investigator McDuff arrests a local homeless man, to whom Pat has given Duncan's jewelry, and the restaurant is willed to Duncan's eldest son, Malcolm. Malcolm sells the restaurant to the McBeths who immediately realize Mac's ideas, and the restaurant's business takes off.

Investigator McDuff returns to Scotland, where the homeless man is cleared, and the McBeths focus their attention on Malcolm. Banko, Mac's friend, questions why Mac had never mentioned the drive-thru concept. Mac grows withdrawn and paranoid and on a hunting trip contemplates killing off Banko, but a vision of the three hippies dressed as deer distracts him. Pat becomes obsessed with her burn injury and accuses people of staring at her repulsive-looking hand, though no scar is visible. Mac then kills Banko with the homeless man's gun, and the body is discovered while new celebrity Mac gives a press conference. Mac calls on an hallucination of Banko to ask a question at the press conference and loses his sanity as the town watches on TV. He then returns to the woods to look for the hippies while Pat becomes deluded into thinking her hand is falling off. Mac then completely loses his sanity, answering and talking on the phone when no one is on the other end. In one conversation, the hippies suggest he kill McDuff's family. Mac grabs the sheriff's gun and orders the officer to call McDuff to the restaurant, where he then shoots McDuff, but the gun proves to be empty. They then wrestle for the inspector's gun on the roof of the restaurant and both fall off. Mac is impaled on the horns of his car. Pat self-medicates with alcohol, but then cuts her hand off and bleeds to death. McDuff takes over the restaurant, fulfilling his dream of working with food.

Cast
 James Le Gros as Joe 'Mac' McBeth, Macbeth
 Maura Tierney as Pat McBeth, Lady Macbeth
 Christopher Walken as Lieutenant McDuff, Macduff
 Kevin Corrigan as Anthony 'Banko' Banconi, Banquo
 James Rebhorn as Norm Duncan, Duncan
 Tom Guiry as Malcolm Duncan
 Amy Smart as Stacy (Hippie #1), Three Witches
 Timothy Levitch as Hector (Hippie #2), Three Witches
 Andy Dick as Jesse (Hippie #3), Three Witches
 Billy Morrissette as man walking his dog in front of the diner at the start of the film

Production 
In South Windsor, Connecticut, his hometown, "I (Morrissette) was 16 and worked at Dairy Queen, and I hated my boss. I had read 'Macbeth' that same year and started telling people that this play would be hysterical if it took place in a fast food restaurant and everyone in the restaurant is named Mac". Morrissette completed the script in 1998.

Press kit
The press kit for the movie was printed in the form of a CliffsNotes booklet, written by Professor David Linton of Marymount Manhattan College, which is what Morrissette was reading when he was studying Shakespeare.

Music
The soundtrack is made up of Bad Company songs because, in Morrissette's words, "the band's catalogue was surprisingly inexpensive".

Reception
Orlando Weekly called it "high-spirited", with "era-hopping giddiness"and "a rib-poking gambol".

The New York Observer called it "a trailer-trash version of Macbeth that should be avoided like an Elizabethan pox" and "grubby low-budget sendup of 70’s pop culture".

Movieguide called it "a hilarious, modern re-telling of William Shakespeare’s great tragic play" and a "morality tale".

Salon.com called it "a one-note movie — the note being a smart-aleck adolescent's idea of a Shakespeare parody".

SPLICEDwire called it "deliriously funny, fast and loose, accessible to the uninitiated, and full of surprises".

Awards
The film was nominated for the Grand Jury Prize at the Sundance Film Festival in 2001.

Adaptation
In 2019 it was announced that a musical adaptation would premiere Off-Broadway at the Laura Pels Theatre by Roundabout Theatre Company. The musical, directed by Lonny Price, features book by Michael Mitnick, music and lyrics by Adam Gwon, and choreography by Josh Rhodes. It starred Ryan McCartan, Taylor Iman Jones, Megan Lawrence, Jay Armstrong Johnson, Jeb Brown, Lacretta, Will Meyers, Alysha Umphress, Kaleb Wells, and David Rossmer.

Further reading
Rippy, Marguerite. "A Fastfood Shakespeare" The Chronicle of Higher Education 19 Apr. 2002: B16.
Jess, Carolyn. "Review of Scotland, PA. Directed by Billy Morrissette. Lot 47, 2001." Early Modern Literary Studies 10.1 (May, 2004): 18.1-5 

Deitchman, Elizabeth. 2006, "White Trash Shakespeare: Taste, Morality, and the Dark Side of the American Dream in Billy Morrissette’s Scotland, PA." Literature/Film Quarterly, vol. 34, no. 2, 2006, pp. 140–46. Salisbury University .
Brown, Eric C. 2006, "Shakespeare, Class, and ‘Scotland, PA.’" Literature/Film Quarterly, vol. 34, no. 2, pp. 147–53. Salisbury University 
Hoefer, Anthony D. 2006, "The McDonaldization of ‘Macbeth’: Shakespeare and Pop Culture in ‘Scotland, PA.’" Literature/Film Quarterly, vol. 34, no. 2, pp. 154–60. Salisbury University .
Marina Gerzic. 2008 "The intersection of Shakespeare and popular culture: an intertextual examination of some millennial Shakespearean film adaptations (1999-2001), with special reference to music" (Doctoral Thesis, School of Social Sciences, University of Western Australia)

Moore, George. 2017. "Macbeth Goes to Carnival: Otium and Economic Determinism in Scotland, PA." Literature/Film Quarterly, vol. 45, no. 3, Salisbury University 

M. Beyad; M. Javanian. (2018) "Fair is foul, and foul is fair”: A carnivalesque approach to Justin Kurzel and Billy Morrissette’s cinematic adaptations of William Shakespeare’s Macbeth" Logos et Littera EISSN : 2336-9884. Published by: Faculty of Philology - University of Montenegro (10.31902).

References

Sources

External links 
 
 

Modern adaptations of works by William Shakespeare
2001 films
Films based on Macbeth
American black comedy films
Films set in 1975
2001 black comedy films
American crime comedy films
2001 independent films
Films scored by Anton Sanko
Films set in Pennsylvania
Films shot in Nova Scotia
2001 comedy films
2000s English-language films
2000s American films